William Charles Sleeth (born October 23, 1979) is a former American soccer player.

External links
 

1979 births
Living people
American soccer players
Washington Huskies men's soccer players
Spokane Shadow players
Seattle Sounders Select players
Chicago Fire FC players
Colorado Rapids players
Seattle Sounders (1994–2008) players
Soccer players from Washington (state)
USL League Two players
Major League Soccer players
A-League (1995–2004) players
USL First Division players
Chicago Fire FC draft picks
Association football defenders